Santosh Sahukhala (born 10 January 1988) is a Nepali international football player.

Early life 

As a child he played at the Madhyapur Football Club. His elder brother Bal Gopal Sahukhala is also a professional footballer. He started playing football as early as eight years old and competed in several school-level tournaments representing his school. He had started out as a defender before his coach at Madhyapur football club changed his position.

Club career

Three Star Club
In 2003, he signed for Three Star Club, spending four years there.

Manang Marsyangdi Club
He signed for Manang Marsyangdi Club, becoming the highest paid Nepali footballer at the time of his signing.

Trials in Indonesia 
In 2011, Sahukhala went on trial for Sriwijaya FC, in Indonesia.

Trials in Japan
In 2014, Sahukhala went on trial for Gainare Tottori, in the Japanese third division.

Chyasal Youth Club
He returned to Nepal playing in the 2018–19 Martyr's Memorial A-Division League and joined A Division Club Chyasal Youth Club. He played 5 matches of Martyr's Memorial A-Division League scoring three goals. After Round 10 of League he returned to Japan. He was given 2 Yellow cards and one Red card in the league. He won the "league man of the match" award in the game against the Himalayan Sherpa Club.

International career

Disciplinary action
Coach Graham Roberts dropped him from the national team for the qualifiers against Timor Leste on disciplinary grounds. He was not present for practice despite calls, and had previously "violated the team norms" during the AFC Challenge Cup.

Reconciliation in national team
Santosh was picked for the next round of qualifications against Jordan and he provided an assist for the home leg equalizer.

Style of play
He is the main striker for the Nepal's National Team.

Career statistics

Club

International

International goals

References

External links
 

1988 births
Living people
Sportspeople from Kathmandu
Nepalese footballers
Nepal international footballers
Nepalese expatriate footballers
Manang Marshyangdi Club players
Three Star Club players
Abahani Limited (Chittagong) players
Expatriate footballers in Bangladesh
Association football forwards